Doug Anthony Hutchison  is an American character actor, known for playing disturbing and antagonistic characters. Such characters include Obie Jameson in the 1988 film The Chocolate War, Sproles in the 1988 film Fresh Horses, the sadistic corrections officer Percy Wetmore in the 1999 film adaptation of the Stephen King novel The Green Mile, Eugene Victor Tooms on the series The X-Files, and Horace Goodspeed in Lost. He owns a production company named Dark Water Inc. In 2011, at the age of 51, he received widespread criticism when he married 16-year-old singer Courtney Stodden.

Early life
Doug Anthony Hutchison was born in Dover, Delaware. He attended Bishop Foley High School in Madison Heights, Michigan and graduated from Apple Valley High School in Apple Valley, Minnesota in 1978. He later attended University of Minnesota at Minneapolis-St Paul, and studied at the Juilliard School in New York City.

Career
Hutchison's first professional theater credit came shortly after he graduated high school, when he starred as Alan Strang in a Saint Paul, Minnesota production of Equus.

Hutchison's early stage credits include Sing Me Through an Open Window and William Shakespeare's Julius Caesar. He has made guest appearances on television shows such as The Young Riders, The X-Files (as Eugene Victor Tooms), Space: Above and Beyond (as Elroy-El), Millennium (as "Omega"), Lost (as Horace Goodspeed), Guiding Light (as Sebastian Hulce), Law & Order: Special Victims Unit (as serial killer Humphrey Becker), and 24 (as European terrorist Davros).

Hutchison's film work began in the late 1980s, appearing as Sproles in the 1988 drama Fresh Horses and Obie Jameson in the 1988 film adaptation of The Chocolate War. Of his performance in Fresh Horses, one critic observed that he "hoist[ed the film] onto his shoulders for the duration of his scenes". In the 1990s, he appeared in films such as The Lawnmower Man (1992), A Time to Kill (1996), Con Air (1997), and Batman & Robin (1997), The Green Mile (1999). His later supporting roles included Shaft (2000), Bait (2000), I Am Sam (2001), The Salton Sea (2002), and No Good Deed (2002).

His 2000s feature film roles included playing James "Looney Bin Jim" Russotti in the Punisher: War Zone, and his television roles included Horace Goodspeed in Lost. He also starred in Give 'Em Hell, Malone (2009). In October 2008, Hutchison's production company, Dark Water, debuted the web series Vampire Killers, which depicts four vampire hunters combating a vampire population of over 500,000 in Los Angeles.

Personal life
On May 20, 2011, Hutchison married his third wife, Courtney Stodden, in Las Vegas. They met when Stodden attended an acting class taught by Hutchison.

Their relationship drew controversy and criticism, as Stodden was 16 years old when the couple married, and Hutchison was 51. According to Hutchison, his agent quit, his family disowned him, he received death threats, and he was labeled a "pedophile", as a result of the marriage. Hutchison had some defenders, however: Stodden's mother, Krista Keller, who praised him for the kindness and love with which he treated Stodden; and Dr. Jenn Berman, a therapist who worked with the couple during their appearance on Couples Therapy.

In October 2012, the couple appeared as one of the celebrity couples in the second season of the VH1 reality television series Couples Therapy, which depicts celebrity couples undergoing counseling for relationship problems. According to Stodden, the couple enrolled in therapy in order to resolve issues that arose in their marriage from their age difference. On November 1, 2013, the media reported that Stodden and Hutchison were ending their marriage of two and a half years and filing for divorce. In August 2014, the pair announced that they had reconciled.

In May 2016, it was announced that the couple was expecting their first child. However, in July 2016, around three months into their pregnancy, Stodden suffered a miscarriage. On May 20, 2016, Hutchison and Stodden celebrated their fifth wedding anniversary by renewing their vows.

In January 2017, it was reported that Stodden and Hutchison had separated, but were still living together at the time. In March 2018, Stodden filed for divorce. The divorce was finalized in March 2020.

On April 8, 2018, Hutchison announced via the Erick & Deer the Goat YouTube channel that he returned to Detroit to find Erick Brown, who travels the country with a therapy goat to spread peace, and that he fully supports Brown's initiative, the Rock Club Foundation.

In 2021, Stodden publicly stated that their marriage was a result of Hutchison's grooming, which supposedly started with him reaching out via email. Hutchison, however, stated in a 2011 interview that Stodden contacted him via email first under her mother's supervision, as confirmed by Courtney herself back then.

Filmography

Film

Television

Video games

References

External links

20th-century American male actors
21st-century American male actors
American male film actors
American male television actors
Child marriage in the United States
Juilliard School alumni
Living people
Male actors from Delaware
Participants in American reality television series
People from Dover, Delaware
University of Minnesota alumni
Apple Valley High School (Minnesota) alumni